The EFMD Quality Improvement System (EQUIS) is an international school accreditation system. It specializes in higher education institutions of management and business administration, run by the European Foundation for Management Development (EFMD). EQUIS has accredited 189 institutions in 45 countries around the world. In 2022, Equis suspended all the Russian institutions from its ranking.

History 
EQUIS' directors in 2018 were Ulrich Hommel and David Asch. As of 2022, the EQUIS director is Alfons Sauquet.  In the past 20 years of existence, the organization has accredited 189 institutions in 45 countries.

Object of the accreditation 
The accreditation is awarded to business schools based on general quality. The process also takes into account the business school's level of internationalization, which is not a strict requirement for accreditation by the other two major international accreditation bodies: AACSB and AMBA. So far, all fully accredited EQUIS business schools applying for AACSB accreditation have succeeded, which has not been the case the other way.

EQUIS accreditation can be granted for three years (with annual progress reports on the areas of improvement required) or for five years (with a mid-term progress report on development objectives required).

See also 
 Association of MBAs (AMBA)
 Association to Advance Collegiate Schools of Business (AACSB)
 List of EQUIS accredited institutions
 Triple accreditation

Notes and references

External links 
 

School accreditors